The Mastodonte dei Giovi was a special double steam locomotive built specifically for use on the difficult Apennine stretch of the new Turin - Genoa railway line, inaugurated in 1853.

History

The construction of the Giovi Railway, which was intended to be the backbone of the Piedmontese railway system connecting Turin to the port city of Genoa, posed the serious problem of how to cross the Giovi Pass with its steep inclines. Initially it was planned to use a rope system with hydraulic motors. However, an international competition announced by the Semmering railway of Austria had brought other solutions more suitable to increase the uphill haulage capacity of the locomotives of the time. 

The Cockerill workshops had studied a solution that met with particular favour. It was a double-boiler locomotive, similar to a Double Fairlie. It had a central firebox on a single long frame, and required a driver and two firemen. This solution impressed the brilliant Italian engineer Germain Sommeiller but he considered it would be difficult to negotiate the sharp curves of the Giovi given the long rigid frame. He then studied an ingenious solution. His machine was composed of two 0-4-0 locomotives coupled back-to-back. The coupling was semi-permanent but was detachable if necessary in case of breakdown or for maintenance. A jointed platform allowed operation with only one driver and one stoker.

The locomotive units were well-proven two-axle machines of Stephenson design. Ten pairs were built, some by Stephenson in England and some by John Cockerill and Company in Seraing, Belgium. A pair of locomotives delivered 382 horsepower and could haul a train of 130 tons at 12 km per hour on a 3.6% gradient. The name "Mastodonti dei Giovi" was borrowed from that of a large fossil found during the excavation of the tunnel near Busalla. The locomotives served until the mid 1870s, when they were replaced by Beugniot locomotives with 4 coupled axles. The locomotives went through several changes of ownership and details are shown in the list below.

Rebuilds

Following their replacement with more modern machines, the SFAI, between 1870 and 1871, studied their re-use:. Two double units, 76 + 77 and 78 + 79 were divided and rebuilt at the Officine Nuove di Torino as separate tank locomotives. A new longer boiler was fitted and the frame was lengthened by adding a third coupled axle. The "new" locomotives became SFAI 1408-1411. In 1874 four units that had taken the numbers SFAI 1404-1407 were separated and coupled to three-axle tenders. In 1885, following the "Conventions" which assigned the stock of the SFAI to the Rete Mediterranea (RM), SFAI 1408-1411 were renumbered RM 5201-5204. In 1905, only two of these four passed to the Ferrovie dello Stato, nos. 5201 and 5203, and they were re-registered as FS 8231 and 8232 (FS Class 823). In 1907, they were renumbered FS 8151 and 8152 (FS Class 815). They were scrapped between 1911 and 1912 and none has been preserved.

Numbering

Glossary
 SFSP = Strade Ferrate dello Stato Piemontese
 SFAI = Società per le strade ferrate dell'Alta Italia
 RM = Rete Mediterranea
 FS = Ferrovie dello Stato

References

Further reading

    Angelo Uleri, il Mastodonte dei Giovi, in I treni, anno 33º, febbraio 2012, n. 345, pp. 24-25
    Zeta-Zeta, [Bruno Bonazzelli] Un po' di storia sul Mastodonte dei Giovi in HO Rivarossi 5 (1958), n.26, p. 14.

0-4-0 locomotives
Ferrovie dello Stato Italiane steam locomotives
Railway locomotives introduced in 1853
Standard gauge locomotives of Italy
Rete Mediterranea steam locomotives